Judas Jump was a British short-lived progressive rock supergroup, formed in 1969.  The band released one album and three singles before disbanding in 1971.  They are best known for their various members who had success before and after Judas Jump.

Career
Judas Jump was established in 1969 as a heavy progressive rock band.  They used mellotron, woodwind and brass in their sound, and secured a recording contract with Parlophone. Keyboardist Andy Bown, and drummer Henry Spinetti, who had earlier worked with the English rock band the Herd, alongside Peter Frampton. After the Herd dissolved, Bown and Spinetti spent two years with Judas Jump.

Also in their line-up was the former Amen Corner saxophonist, Allan Jones, who switched to playing mainly woodwind.  The band issued three singles in 1969 and 1970, followed by their only album, Scorch (1970). A United States release on the MGM-distributed Pride Records was oddly delayed until 1972, by which time the group had disbanded. On 14 February 1970, Judas Jump featured on the cover of the British music magazine, NME.

Judas Jump were the opening act on 26 August 1970 at the Isle of Wight Festival. On 24 October 1970, Judas Jump played a concert at Polesworth's Memorial Hall. Although they attracted considerable press coverage, their records sold poorly, and did not reach either the UK Singles Chart or UK Albums Chart.

Although Adrian Williams was listed as lead vocalist, Andy Bown is the lead vocalist on almost all tracks.  In a mid-1980s interview for a fanzine, (The Rock Marketplace), Bown admitted that as leader, primary song writer, and producer, he decided to replace most of the vocals with his own prior to the album's release.

Bown ultimately joined Status Quo. Fellow band member, Charlie Harrison, played with the American country rock band Poco, between 1978 and 1984. Spinetti went on to various session musician work, including playing on Gerry Rafferty's single, "Baker Street".

Lineup
Allan Jones (woodwind) – born 6 February 1947, Swansea, Glamorgan, South Wales
Andy Bown (keyboards, guitar) – born Andrew Steven Bown, 27 March 1946, Beckenham, London, England
Henry Spinetti (drums) – born Henry Anthony George Spinetti, 31 March 1951, Cwm, near Ebbw Vale, South Wales
Charlie Harrison (bass guitar) - born Charles Harrison, 1952, Tamworth, Staffordshire
Adrian Williams (vocals)
Trevor Williams (lead guitar)

Discography

Albums

Singles

Bibliography
The Tapestry of Delights - The Comprehensive Guide to British Music of the Beat, R&B, Psychedelic and Progressive Eras 1963-1976, Vernon Joynson,

References

External links

Brief biography and discography at Alexgitlin.com
Biography and album review at Badcatrecords.com

British progressive rock groups
Musical groups established in 1969
Musical groups disestablished in 1971
1969 establishments in England